NYC: Tornado Terror is a 2008 Canadian television disaster film. It stars Nicole de Boer, Sebastian Spence, and Jerry Wasserman. It premiered on Sci-Fi Channel on October 4, 2008, and is directed by Tibor Takács.

The film is about global warming which causes the upper and lower atmosphere to separate so that their different movements generate huge electrical charges which causes huge electrical tornadoes to drop on New York City causing destruction and loss of life. Dr. Cassie Lawrence tries to stop the twisters as chaos ensues. NASA ignores the mayor who recommends following Dr. Lawrence's advice and use silver iodide on the atmosphere instead, which makes things worse, so it is down to our heroes to use a rebel scientist with his own makeshift rockets to use dry ice (frozen ). The problem is solved, but before the film ends, the same storm effects begin in Paris.

Cast
 Nicole de Boer as Dr. Cassie Lawrence
 Sebastian Spence as James 'Jim' Lawrence
 Jerry Wasserman as Mayor Leonardo
 Tegan Moss as Lori Lawrence

Home media release
The film was released on DVD on May 25, 2010.

References

External links 
 

2008 films
2008 television films
2000s disaster films
Canadian disaster films
English-language Canadian films
Canadian television films
Disaster television films
2000s English-language films
Films about tornadoes
Films scored by Clinton Shorter
Films set in New York City
Syfy original films
Films directed by Tibor Takács
2000s American films
2000s Canadian films